Wendell Pellett (March 15, 1917 – January 9, 1996) was an American politician who served in the Iowa House of Representatives from 1971 to 1991.

He died on January 9, 1996, in Des Moines, Iowa at age 78.

References

1917 births
1996 deaths
Republican Party members of the Iowa House of Representatives
20th-century American politicians